Southern Pacific Railroad's AC-2 class of steam locomotives was the second in the AC series of cab forward locomotives built for Southern Pacific (SP).  This class consisted of locomotives that were rebuilt from Baldwin-built SP MC-4 class locomotives by 1930.

The locomotives were deemed successful and remained in active service until after World War II.

References 
 

Baldwin locomotives
Mallet locomotives
AC-02
2-8-8-2 locomotives
Simple articulated locomotives
Steam locomotives of the United States
Scrapped locomotives
Standard gauge locomotives of the United States

Freight locomotives 
Cab forward steam locomotives